HMS Chiddingfold is a  of the British Royal Navy. She was launched in October 1983 by her sponsor, Lady Anne Kennon, and formally entered the service of the Royal Navy in October 1984. Chiddingfold is a minehunter, and her purpose is to find and destroy mines, not only in a time of war but also in peacetime. There are about a quarter of a million mines still active from the Second World War alone and they pose a major threat to both military and civilian ships. Chiddingfold is able to enter some types of minefields without the mines detonating.  This is because she is made of glass-reinforced plastic and all fixtures within the ship are made of non-ferrous metals, keeping the ship's magnetic signature to the bare minimum.

Operational history

In January 2012, Chiddingfold began a year-long mid-life upgrade project, including the replacement of her engines, gearboxes, propellers and an upgraded thruster system; she was the first vessel of her class to undergo the refurbishment.

She returned to the UK in 2017 after being relieved by sister . 

In this role, crews for Chiddingfold rotate every four months.

Affiliations
Chiddingfold has a connection with the village of Chiddingfold, and every year they have a stall at the Chiddingfold fete. HMS Chiddingfold is also affiliated with the Worshipful Company of Pattenmakers, one of the City of London's Livery Companies.

References

External links

  

1983 ships
Hunt-class mine countermeasures vessels